The Waynesburg Yellow Jackets football program is a college football team that represents Waynesburg University in the Presidents' Athletic Conference, a part of the Division III (NCAA).  The team has had 21 head coaches since its first recorded football game in 1895. The current coach is Cornelius Coleman who first took the position for the 2022 season.

Key

Coaches
Statistics correct as of 2022.

Notes

References

Lists of college football head coaches

Pennsylvania sports-related lists